A transmission (also called a gearbox) is a mechanical device which uses gears to change the speed or direction of rotation in a mechanical device. Many transmissions have multiple gear ratios, but there are also transmissions that use a single fixed gear ratio.

Most currently-produced passenger cars with petrol or diesel engines use transmissions with 5-8 forward gear ratios and one reverse gear ratio. Electric vehicles typically use a single-speed or two-speed transmission.

Fixed-ratio transmissions 

The simplest transmissions used a fixed ratio to provide either a gear reduction or increase in speed, sometimes in conjunction with a change in the orientation of the output shaft. Examples of such transmissions are used in helicopters, wind turbines and power take-offs (PTOs) for tractors. In the case of a wind turbine, the first stage of the gearbox is usually a planetary gear, to minimize the size while withstanding the high torque inputs from the turbine.

Multi-ratio transmissions 

Many transmissions - especially for transportation applications - have multiple gear ratios that can be switched between while the machine is operating. The multiple ratios are used to match the range of input speeds (e.g. engine rpm) with the output speed (e.g. the speed of a car) required for a given situation.

Manual

A manual transmission requires the driver to manually select the gears by operating a gear stick and clutch (which is usually a foot pedal for cars or a hand lever for motorcycles).

Most transmissions in modern cars use synchromesh to synchronise the speeds of the input and output shafts. However, prior to the 1950s, most cars used non-synchronous transmissions.

Sequential manual 

A sequential manual transmission is a type of non-synchronous transmission used mostly for motorcycles and racing cars. It produces faster shift times than synchronized manual transmissions, through the use of dog clutches rather than synchromesh. Sequential manual transmissions also restricts the driver to selecting either the next or previous gear, in a successive order.

Automatic and semi-automatic 

An automatic transmission does not require any input from the driver to change forward gears under normal driving conditions. A semi-automatic transmission is where some of the operation is automated (often the actuation of the clutch), but the driver's input is required to move off from a standstill or to change gears.

Hydraulic automatic 

The most common design of automatic transmissions is the hydraulic automatic, which typically uses planetary gearsets that are operated using hydraulics. The transmission is connected to the engine via a torque converter (or a fluid coupling prior to the 1960s), instead of the friction clutch used by most manual transmissions and dual-clutch transmissions.

Dual-clutch (DCT) 

A dual-clutch transmission (DCT) uses two separate clutches for odd and even gear sets. The design is often similar to two separate manual transmissions with their respective clutches contained within one housing, and working as one unit. In car and truck applications, the DCT functions as an automatic transmission, requiring no driver input to change gears.

Continuously variable (CVT)

A continuously variable transmission (CVT) can change seamlessly through a continuous range of gear ratios. This contrasts with other transmissions that provide a limited number of gear ratios in fixed steps. The flexibility of a CVT with suitable control may allow the engine to operate at a constant RPM while the vehicle moves at varying speeds.

CVTs are used in cars, tractors, side-by-sides, motor scooters, snowmobiles, bicycles, and earthmoving equipment.

The most common type of CVT uses two pulleys connected by a belt or chain; however, several other designs have also been used at times.

Automated manual / clutchless manual 

An automated manual transmission (AMT) is essentially a conventional manual transmission that uses automatic actuation to operate the clutch and/or shift between gears.

Many early versions of these transmissions were semi-automatic in operation, such as Autostick, which automatically control only the clutch, but still require the driver's input to initiate gear changes. Some of these systems are also referred to as clutchless manual systems. Modern versions of these systems that are fully automatic in operation, such as Selespeed and Easytronic, can control both the clutch operation and the gear shifts automatically, without any input from the driver.

Applications

Early uses 
Early transmissions included the right-angle drives and other gearing in windmills, horse-powered devices, and steam-powered devices. Applications of these devices included pumps, mills and hoists.

Automobiles 

The need for multiple gear ratios in ICE-powered motor vehicles is because the engines typically operate over a range of approximately 600-7000 rpm, while the road speed of the vehicle typically equates to a rotational speed of the wheels in the range of 0-1800 rpm. In addition, the engine's characteristics result in different optimal rpm ranges for the power band and achieving highest fuel efficiency.

Motorcycles

See also

Bicycle gearing
Direct-drive mechanism
Transfer case

References

 
Mechanisms (engineering)